Cyclophora azorensis is a moth in the  family Geometridae. It is found on the Azores.

The wingspan is 22–25 mm. It is similar to Cyclophora maderensis, but has broader wings and has a denser reddish irroration.

The larvae feed on Erica species.

References

Moths described in 1920
Cyclophora (moth)
Moths of Europe